Fred Armisen is an American comedian, actor, writer, producer, and musician.

He is known for his work on various television shows including Saturday Night Live, Portlandia, Documentary Now!, Moonbase 8, and Big Mouth.

Film

Television

Theatre

Video games

References 

American filmographies
Male actor filmographies